Crocodilurus is a lizard genus that belongs to the family Teiidae. It is monotypic, with only a single described species, Crocodilurus amazonicus, the crocodile tegu. It is locally known as the jacarerana. This semiaquatic lizard has a flattened, paddle-like tail and is found in the Amazon Basin and the Guiana Shield in South America. It feeds on arthropods, amphibians, reptiles and fish. It is not related to crocodilians.

References

Further reading
Avila-Pires, T.C.S. (1995). Lizards of Brazilian Amazonia (Reptilia: Squamata). Zoologische Verhandelingen 299: 1-706
Harvey, M.B., Ugueto, G.N. & Gutberlet, R.L. (2012). Review of Teiid Morphology with a Revised Taxonomy and Phylogeny of the Teiidae (Lepidosauria: Squamata). Zootaxa 3459: 1–156.
Massary, J.C. de & Hoogmoed, M.S. (2001). Crocodilurus amazonicus Spix, 1825: The valid name for Crocodilurus lacertinus auctorum (nec Daudin, 1802) (Squamata: Teiidae). Journal of Herpetology 35 (2): 353–357.
Spix, J.B. von (1825). Animalia nova sive species nova lacertarum quas in itinere per Brasiliam annis MDCCCXVII-MDCCCXX jussu et auspicius Maximiliani Josephi I Bavariae Regis suscepto collegit et descripsit Dr. J. B. de Spix, Lipsiae: T. O. Weigel; F. S. Hübschmanni, Monachii, 26 pp. (Original description).

External links

Teiidae
Monotypic lizard genera
Reptiles of Brazil
Reptiles of Colombia
Reptiles of French Guiana
Reptiles of Peru
Reptiles of Venezuela
Taxa named by Johann Baptist von Spix